Mäenpää is a Finnish surname. Notable people with the surname include:

Jari Mäenpää, Finnish metal musician
Juha Mäenpää, Finnish politician
Niilo Mäenpää, Finnish footballer
Niki Mäenpää, Finnish goalkeeper
Olavi Mäenpää, Finnish politician
Outi Mäenpää, Finnish actress
Olli Mäenpää, Finnish academic

Finnish-language surnames